Glenda Kemp (born 1949) is a South African stripper, activist, and teacher.

Early life 
Glenda Kemp was born in the Cape Province on 13 May 1949. As a young girl, she lived in the working class suburb of La Rochelle with her mother, stepfather, and younger brother. Her two older siblings were in an orphanage in Potchefstroom; she was later to be sent to the orphanage too. Kemp was adopted by Tannie and Oom Baumbach into their Christian home in the small farming town of Swartruggens. In 1969, she enrolled into the Teachers' Training College in Potchefstroom. It was here she discovered dancing; her skill would be appreciated, as well as detested by many in the future.

 She later transferred to the Goudstad Teachers' Training College in Johannesburg to continue dancing in Go-go dancing clubs.

Stripper 
It was during the conservative 1970s, that Kemp began stripping with "Oupa", her pet python. Her scandalous actions and her provocative moves caused the Vice Squad to do their best to stop her, without success. The newspaper Rapport tagged her "Newsmaker of the Year". She was arrested on numerous occasions and charged with public indecency. Faced with barricades of Christian wives on one side and loyal fans and liberals on the other, she never gave up, but continued to provoke the attention of the public.

Dirk De Villiers made Snake Dancer, giving Kemp the opportunity to tell her story in a full-length movie. The film was not well received by the South African public. She planned to leave her snake and dancing behind and follow a teaching career. Her notoriety resulted in many rejections at interviews for teaching positions. She then travelled to London to continue her dancing career there. She worked for Paul Raymond (publisher) in the Raymond Revuebar and at the Windmill Theatre. She also became a relief house mother at Epworth Children's Home.

Later life 
In the 1980s, Glenda put her dancing career behind her, moved back to South Africa, started a family with her husband, Karl Koczwara, and completed her teacher training and became a teacher. She returned to the Christian faith of her early teen years, and began a lay ministry to children and to the vulnerable people of society including prostitutes and drug addicts.  She now lives in Durban in retirement.

Koczwara and Kemp got married in 1982, and eventually divorced in 1991. On 12 July 2019, Koczwara was beaten to death with a hammer in his Johannesburg home.

Popular culture 
 Snake Dancer, a feature-length movie of her early life was made in 1976 by Dirk de Villiers 
 Bladsy 3 (Page 3), a play in Afrikaans  had a run at the Klein Karoo Nasionale Kunstefees in January 2014
 Dances with Snakes, a half-hour TV documentary of her life was made in 1996 and shown on the SABC 3 TV channel.
 Glenda Kemp, a single by Spoegwolf, was released on 21 March 2014.

See also 

 :af:Pens en Pootjies

Notes and references 

 
 
 
 
 
 
 
  Alt URL

External links 
 
 
 , directed by Dirk de Villiers in 1976, featuring Glenda Kemp as Glenda Williams.
 Bladsy 3 - play about the life of Glenda Kemp

South African female dancers
South African women activists
South African female erotic dancers
Living people
1949 births